Treasure is a surname. Notable people with the surname include:

Cyril Treasure (1896–1985), English footballer
David Treasure, Welsh rugby league player
David Treasure (politician) (1943–2018), Australian politician
Frank Treasure (1925–1998), Australian rules footballer
Rachael Treasure (born 1968), Australian journalist and writer
Sisely Treasure, American singer and dancer